A special election was held in 1820 in  to fill a vacancy caused by the resignation of Edward Dowse (DR) on May 26, 1820

Election results

Eustis took his seat November 13, 1820

See also
List of special elections to the United States House of Representatives

References

Massachusetts 1820 13
Massachusetts 1820 13
1820 13
Massachusetts 13
United States House of Representatives 13
United States House of Representatives 1820 13